
Sochaczew County is a unit of territorial administration and local government (powiat) in Masovian Voivodeship, east-central Poland. It came into being on January 1, 1999, as a result of the Polish local government reforms passed in 1998.

As of 2019 its total population is 85,024, out of which the population of Sochaczew is 36,327, and the rural population is 48,697.

Neighbouring counties
Sochaczew County is bordered by Płońsk County to the north, Nowy Dwór County to the north-east, Warsaw West County and Grodzisk Mazowiecki County to the east, Żyrardów County to the south-east, Skierniewice County to the south, Łowicz County to the south-west, Gostynin County to the west, and Płock County to the north-west.

Administrative division
The county is subdivided into eight gminas (one urban and seven rural). These are listed in the following table, in descending order of population.

References

 
Sochaczew